The athletics competitions at the 2012 Olympic Games in London were held during the last 10 days of the Games, on 3–12 August. Track and field events took place at the Olympic Stadium in east London. The road events, however, started and finished on The Mall in central London.

Over 2,000 athletes from 201 nations competed in 47 events in total, with both men and women having a very similar schedule of events. Men competed in 24 events and women in 23, of which 21 were the same for both. The women's schedule lacked the 50 km race walk and included 100 m hurdles and heptathlon as opposed to the men's 110 m hurdles and decathlon. The youngest participant in the athletics competition was Andorran 15-year-old Cristina Llovera while the oldest was 46-year-old Ukrainian Oleksandr Dryhol. South African Oscar Pistorius became the first amputee sprinter to compete at the Olympics.

Competition schedule 
The venue for the track and field events was the Olympic Stadium while the walks and the marathons started and finished on The Mall. In the tables below, M stands for morning and A for afternoon.

Medal summary 
(WR = World Record, OR = Olympic Record)

Medal table

Note: Three competitors tied for silver in the men's high jump event.

Men

 *Indicates the athlete only competed in the preliminary heats.
  Tyson Gay was stripped of his silver medal due to a doping violation. The United States team was disqualified.
  On 24 March 2016, the Court of Arbitration for Sport has issued decision that all competitive results obtained by Sergey Kirdyapkin of Russia from 20 August 2009 to 15 October 2012 are disqualified for doping use. Redistribution of the medals in this event occurred on 17 June 2016, with Tallent awarded the gold medal by the IOC at a ceremony in Melbourne, Australia, with Si claiming silver and Heffernan bronze.
  Gold medalist Ivan Ukhov of Russia was disqualified for doping in 2019. Medals were reallocated in 2021.
  Original silver medalist Oleksandr Pyatnytsya of Ukraine was stripped of his silver medal and result following a positive finding in a retest of his 2012 anti-doping sample. On 24 February 2017 Antti Ruuskanen received the silver medal in Finland. On 28 June 2017 Vítězslav Veselý received the bronze medal in Czech Republic.

Women

 *Indicates the athlete only competed in the preliminary heats.
   On 10 February 2017, the Court of Arbitration for Sport upheld a four-year ban that effectively stripped of the gold medal of Mariya Savinova of Russia, based upon irregularities in her biological passport and doping. Caster Semenya of South Africa was advanced to gold, Ekaterina Poistogova of Russia to silver, and Pamela Jelimo of Kenya to bronze. Poistogova herself was later found guilty of doping, but her Olympic results were unaffected, and the IOC decided to upgrade her medal.
  On 17 August 2015, the Court of Arbitration for Sport says it approved a settlement agreed to by Turkish athlete Aslı Çakır Alptekin and the IAAF. Alptekin has agreed to forfeit her 1500 metres Olympic title and serve an eight-year ban for blood doping. On 29 March 2017, Turkish athlete Gamze Bulut was banned for doping and lost her Olympic silver medal. Maryam Yusuf Jamal of Bahrain was advanced to gold, the silver medal was awarded to Tatyana Tomashova of Russia, and the bronze medal was awarded to Abeba Aregawi of Ethiopia. Tomashova was earlier found guilty of doping and missed the 2008 Olympics because of that, and was banned after the Olympics for failing another drug test.
  In October 2022, more than 10 years and 2 months after the race, Natalya Antyukh's results from July 2012 to June 2013 were disqualified for doping after a retest of her samples, stripping her of the gold medal in the 400 m hurdles at the 2012 Summer Olympics. Medals are not yet reallocated.
  On 30 January 2015, the IOC confirmed that runner Yuliya Zaripova, Russia, will be stripped of her gold medal in the 3,000 metres steeplechase after testing positive for anabolic steroids. On 4 June 2016, the gold medal was officially reallocated to second place Habiba Ghribi from Tunisia by the IOC and IAAF updated the results.
  On 1 February 2017, the International Olympic Committee stripped the silver medal of the Russian team due to doping of Antonina Krivoshapka Medals were reallocated.
  On 24 March 2016, the Court of Arbitration for Sport has issued decision that all competitive results obtained by Olga Kaniskina from 15 August 2009 to 15 October 2012 are disqualified for doping. Qieyang Shenjie of China was advanced to silver, and Liu Hong of China to bronze.
  Bronze medalist Svetlana Shkolina of Russia was disqualified for doping in 2019. The bronze medal was then reallocated to Ruth Beitia of Spain in 2021.
  The original winner, Nadzeya Ostapchuk of Belarus, was stripped of her gold medal shortly after the event after failing a doping test. The rest of the competitors were elevated by one position accordingly. On 20 August 2016, Yevgeniya Kolodko of Russia was also stripped of her silver medal after retested samples from the competition returned a positive doping result. Gong Lijiao of China was advanced to silver, and Li Ling of China to bronze.
  The original silver medalist, Darya Pishchalnikova of Russia, was stripped of her silver medal after failing drugs tests. The rest of the competitors were elevated by one position accordingly.
  The original gold medalist, Tatyana Lysenko of Russia, was stripped of her gold medal after failing drugs tests. Medals were reallocated.
  On 29 November 2016, the Court of Arbitration for Sport has issued decision that all competitive results of original bronze medalist Tatyana Chernova of Russia between 15 August 2011 and 22 July 2013 are annulled due to failed drug tests. The bronze medal was awarded to Austra Skujytė of Lithuania.

Records

World and Olympic records
A total of four world records in athletics and eleven Olympic records were broken during the competition. This was fewer than were set at the Beijing Olympics (5 world, 17 Olympic records) but greater than the number set at the 2004 Games in Athens (2 world, 10 Olympic records).

China's Chen Ding was the first Olympic record breaker, improving the men's 20 km walk record. All three Olympic walk records were broken in London as Sergey Kirdyapkin bettered the Olympic 50 km walk time and Elena Lashmanova set a new world record in the women's 20 km walk. However, both records from Russian racewalkers were later rescinded due to doping.

Usain Bolt was the first track athlete to improve an Olympic record as he defended his 100 m title with a run of 9.63 s. He later joined the Jamaican 4 × 100 metres relay team (featuring Nesta Carter, Michael Frater and Yohan Blake) to set a world record time of 36.84 s. The women's 4 × 100 metres relay event also saw a world record: an American team of Tianna Madison, Allyson Felix, Bianca Knight and Carmelita Jeter ran 40.82 seconds to take half a second off a record which had stood for nearly 27 years. Further women's Olympic records were set by Ethiopia's Tiki Gelana in the marathon and Sally Pearson in the 100 metres hurdles.

David Rudisha improved his own 800 metres world record to 1:40.91 minutes, becoming the first man to break that record at the Olympics since Ralph Doubell did so at the 1968 Games. Renaud Lavillenie was the only man to break a field event record, as he cleared an Olympic best of 5.97 m to win the pole vault competition.

Doping
Prior to the Olympic competition, several prominent athletes were ruled out of the competition due to failed tests. World indoor medallists Dimitrios Chondrokoukis, Debbie Dunn, and Mariem Alaoui Selsouli were withdrawn from their Olympic teams in July for doping, as was 2004 Olympic medallist Zoltán Kővágó. At the Olympic competition, Tameka Williams admitted to taking a banned stimulant and was removed from the games. Ivan Tsikhan did not compete in the hammer throw as a re-test of his sample from the 2004 Athens Olympics, where he won silver, was positive. Hassan Hirt, Amine Laâlou, Marina Marghieva, Diego Palomeque, and defending 50 km walk champion Alex Schwazer were also suspended before taking part in their events.

Syrian hurdler Ghfran Almouhamad became the first track-and-field athlete to be suspended following a positive in-competition doping sample. Nadzeya Astapchuk was stripped of the women's shot put title after her sample came back positive for the banned anabolic agent metenolone. Karin Melis Mey was withdrawn before the long jump final when an earlier failed doping test was confirmed.

Multiple medalists were found guilty of doping after the Olympics. Russia has the most (9) medals stripped.

See also
 Athletics at the 2012 Summer Olympics – Qualification

References

External links

 
 
 
 
 IAAF Olympics webpage
 BBC Sport Olympic athletics website

 
2012 Summer Olympics events
Olympic Games
2012
2012 Olympic Games
2012